Valerio Cleri (born 19 June 1981 in Palestrina) is a freestyle swimmer from Italy, who primarily competes in open water swimming.

Career
Cleri won a gold medal in the 25 km open water race at the 2009 World Aquatics Championships in Rome.
At the 2010 FINA World Open Water Swimming Championships in Canada he won the gold medal over the 10 km distance. At the 2010 European Aquatics Championships in Budapest, Hungary he won silver medal over the 10 km distance and gold medal over the 25 km distance.  He competed at the 10 km swimming marathon at the 2008 Summer Olympics (finishing fourth) and at the 2012 Summer Olympics (finishing 17th).

References
sports-reference

1981 births
Living people
People from Palestrina
Italian male swimmers
Italian male long-distance swimmers
Swimmers at the 2008 Summer Olympics
Swimmers at the 2012 Summer Olympics
Olympic swimmers of Italy
World Aquatics Championships medalists in open water swimming
Swimmers of Gruppo Sportivo Esercito
Italian male freestyle swimmers
Sportspeople from the Metropolitan City of Rome Capital
20th-century Italian people
21st-century Italian people